Hemant Batra (born 15 August 1967) is an Indian business, public policy, corporate and commercial senior practicing lawyer, newspaper – columnist writer author, TV anchor/Host, public speaker, commentator (law & public policy), mentor, and legal counsel. He was the co-founder and counsel at Kaden Boriss Global, an alliance and forum of independent and autonomous law firms and legal enterprises. Hemant holds a position as the Secretary General of SAARCLAW (South Asian Association for Regional Co-operation in Law). SAARCLAW is a regional Apex body of SAARC (South Asian Association for Regional Cooperation). He has also authored several books on law and policy. He was engaged by the Lok Sabha as a Guest Anchor and Guide for a fresh series of Sansad TV called `75 Years: Laws That Shaped India' The other Guest Anchors engaged by the Parliament for Sansad TV being Bibek Debroy, Dr Karan Singh, Amitabh Kant, Shashi Tharoor, Maroof Raza and Sanjeev Sanyal. The global TV channel Sansad TV was launched by the Prime Minister of India Narendra Modi, Vice President of India Venkaiah Naidu and Speaker of Lok Sabha Om Birla on 15 September 2021.

Hemant Batra withdrew from all active roles in Kaden Boriss law firm in 2015 and formally quit the law firm in 2016. He now independently practises law as an arguing Counsel in the Indian Supreme Court and Delhi High Court. He is seen now in the roles of arbitrator, mediator, conciliator, tutor of law and public policy. He is authoring books for Eastern Book Company.

Kaden Boriss partnered with I-Inspire 2013, a national conference for women leaders, aiming to be a confluence of ideas, a convergence of thoughts and celebration of the spirit of diversity and entrepreneurship. He is also the chairperson of the Organizing Council of International Infrastructure & Construction Law Arbitration Moot (IICLAM) and member of the advisory board of the Organisation for International Cooperation (OIC) based in New Jersey, US. IICLAM is a joint initiative of Kaden Boriss, National University of Singapore (NUS) and Singapore International Arbitration Centre (SIAC), Singapore. He is a recipient of the Mahatma Gandhi Seva Medal. Batra took over as the chairman of the panel of jury for the grant of Aces Awards for Corporate Excellence and Sustainability in Asia.

"We are committed to social justice and can play a key role in encouraging legal reforms and disseminating information on progressive decisions, related to human rights, across the legal community in South Asia," says Hemant Batra on the UNDP website.

Batra joined the advisory board of the pivotals, the first ever stakeholders engagement platform. In his role as a policy specialist and global business lawyer, he was invited to join the leadership team of a well known not for profit organization.

Batra was appointed in July 2017 as an active member of the Union of International Associations (UIA), the only appointment from India that year.

He established his music label called Urf Hekbat to accomplish his passion of playing, composing and arranging lounge and new age music. This fact was disclosed by him in an interview given to a well-known lawyers monthly magazine. He is also a sound recording artist.

Law and public policy facet 

Batra is associated with National Law University, Delhi. Batra presented a paper on issues connected with WTO at the 10th SAARCLAW Conference held at Karachi on the theme, "Leap Forward – Next Generation Laws". 20 February 2004 The first annual Asia Entrepreneurship Forum (AEF), organised by Enterprise Asia kicked off on 19 September 2012. Five hundred of the region's leading business leaders and industry thought leaders gathered in Macau, one of Asia's fastest growing cities to discuss the future of entrepreneurship in Asia. Hemant K. Batra, Secretary General at SAARCLAW spoke on legal and regulatory issues in mergers and acquisitions deals.

Though not as a Secretary-General of SAARCLAW but taking advantage of his standing in South Asia including Pakistan, he took up the issue of grant of mercy to the Indian prisoner Sarabjit Singh (now deceased). Batra has done substantial work for ensuring legal rights of people living with HIV and key populations at higher risk of exposure to HIV.

Considered as one of the prominent authorities on cross-border issues connected with the legal profession, he was invited by the Harvard Law School to share his thoughts with senior students on the Future Market for Corporate Legal Services in India.

He has always mooted for opening up of the legal profession in India be it allowing foreign lawyers as well as showcasing. According to him medicine and law were once on the same footing as "noble professions" and as the corporatization of the medical profession has been permitted, the restrictions on lawyers are unjustified. These views were expressed by him to the Live Mint and the Wall Street Journal.

Batra vociferously defended former IPL chairman Lalit Modi in UK as well as in India. Three leading publications captured his interview, namely, India Today, Daily Mail UK and Tehelka.

He recently mooted the idea of large scale repeal of laws. He supported and complimented the landmark initiative taken by the Narendra Modi Government in India in repealing obsolete laws. He also emphasized that repeal of laws is as significant as the passage of new laws. He was one of the first set of legal experts who covered the legal aspects connected with Coronavirus or COVID-19.

As Chairman of the Jury, Batra has propagated a policy change in the way businesses are run and managed. According to him, a successful business goes beyond money-making. Societal responsibilities are key to successful businesses.

He highlighted and favoured the policy of Narendra Modi BJP Government in India regarding the enhancement of traffic violation fines. A public policy expert and commentator Hemant Batra opines that Insolvency and Bankruptcy Code, 2016 is a phenomenal economic law and public policy reform of the last decade, which provided a revolutionary shift of earlier law from a defaulting debtor controlling assets until resolution or liquidation, to the creditors in command of the NPAs during resolution or liquidation. Further under the Insolvency and Bankruptcy Code, a new route to M&A has emerged. The distressed assets are the new targets for bigger companies planning to grow through the organic route. This is according to Batra.

Expressing his public policy opinion on the Indian cryptocurrency market to a well-known online publication, he said that the "cryptocurrency market has now become very big with involvement of billions of dollars in the market hence, it is now unattainable and irreconcilable for the government to completely ban all sorts of cryptocurrency and its trading and investment". He mooted regulating the cryptocurrency market rather than completely banning it. He favoured following IMF and FATF guidelines in this regard.

Origin and background 
Hemant was born in Hisar located in the Indian state of Haryana, in a Punjabi Family to Veena Batra and G.L Batra who was the Additional Secretary in the Indian parliament and Chairman of the Haryana State Public Service Commission.  In 1988 he graduated with bachelor's degree in Humanities and in 1991 received his Bachelor of Law degree from Chandigarh Law faculty in Panjab University. Hemant Batra and his wife Preeti Wahi Batra, who is also a prominent commercial lawyer were interviewed by a leading international business magazine Outlook Money regarding changing trends in investing for the future of one's child. They have two children . Hemant has a fetish for electronic gadgets and changes them every six months.

Legal and socio-economic pathways 
Hemant started his law practice in 1991 with Solicitors – Amarchand & Mangaldas & Suresh A Shroff & Co. Four years later he joined Kesar Dass B. & Associates and by the year 2000 became a managing partner of its corporate office. In 2003, he founded an independent international law firm named Kaden Boriss Legal. Kaden Boriss then became an alliance and network of independent/autonomous member law firms located in India, Australia and UAE. Each member firm and office has no financial relationship with another. A prominent Australian law firm LBR Legal merged its practice with Batra's law firm Kaden Boriss in 2010 when the Managing Partner of LBR Sunil Lal said that 'if you can't beat Indians then the best way is to join them'.

Hemant has worked with many multinational firms such as Bayer, Suzuki, LG, Philip Morris (JV), Coca-Cola, Accor, Findel, AMEX, Western Union, ABB and Knight Frank. He has also been an advisor for various former Chief Justices of India, Senior Counsels and Members of the Indian Parliament. On the social front Hemant associated with United Nations Development Programme (UNDP), UNAIDS, and the World Bank by venturing into a very sensitive zone thereby discussing Human Rights Challenges Faced by Key Populations at Higher Risk of HIV. He has always propagated the idea of Parents respecting the sexual preferences of their kids. People find themselves so busy these days that they only have vague succession plans with no documentation. But irrespective of age (everyone) needs to keep his or her succession planning ready as death always comes unannounced, propagates Hemant Batra. Recently, one eminent lawyer from Cornell described Hemant as one of the best brains in the corporate transactional legal work.

He is Goodwill Ambassador to the World NGO Day, headquartered in London. The World NGO Day is an international calendar day held on 27 February every year. For stronger, better & more effective civil society worldwide through an international annual calendar day for NGOs, NPOs and CSOs. WND Secretariat and SAARCLAW have entered into an MoU on 24 February 2012 to promote objectives of their respective organizations and also expand NGO horizons in India and the SAARC region.

He was re-elected as the Secretary General of SAARCLAW on 12 April 2014 in Kathmandu when India and Pakistan came together to propose his name and Bangladesh/Bhutan seconded it.

Hemant Batra as the Chairman of the prestigious panel of jury for the grant of Aces Awards for Corporate Excellence and Sustainability in Asia promoted the concept of excellence and sustainability in the corporate world terming it as integral part of good governance. He has started propagating that the concept of corporate governance does not merely relate to management of the companies but also excellence and sustainability. He heads the prominent jury in Asia, which identifies global business leaders who have shown signs of good governance.

Books and Publications 
Hemant Batra's book on Due Diligence published by a well-known law and public policy publisher EBC (Eastern Book Company) has been reviewed as a must-read book for any professional looking to be a part of India’s vibrant M&A industry. The book has been highly recommended as an outstanding handbook or operating manual for those engaging in due diligence relating to business or asset acquisitions.

Batra's other book, which received global acclaim and appreciation is titled Mediation - Legitimacy & Practice. The book written under the layman series is forwarded by Justice R.C. Lahoti Former Chief Justice of India and reviewed by K.K. Venugopal, Attorney General of India.

Criticism 
It is noticed that Hemant has been unnecessarily critical of newer legislation and even verdicts passed by courts of law. As Secretary General of SAARCLAW, he made a controversial public statement that in south Asian region the parliamentarians were not able to meet up expectations of their people.

He made a controversial statement in a leading English newspaper The Tribune by expressing concern over the alleged ill-treatment of Mr Justice Rana Bhagwandas, the first Hindu to be appointed Acting Chief Justice of Pakistan, and his family members by immigration authorities at the Wagah border on 29 March 2006. He also released a very controversial report in collaboration with UNDP seeking stronger legal protection for women in health care settings. The report reflects many gaps in laws in South Asia and is very women-specific and specific gender-based thereby creating complete dissension amongst gender. This report has come under heavy criticism for being lope-sided.

Batra just wants to be in news by speaking on contentious and critically controversial issues. In 2007, he had made a sweeping allegation against residents of big cities stating that they had a load of unaccounted cash monies which they were investing in far-off agriculture lands located in remote states. He said that their motive was to eventually blend their black monies with agricultural income. He branded such people as money launderers. Batra was also quoted in The Pulitzer Center on Crisis Reporting for having said that "India is today the most isolated country within its region." This definitely was a strong comment against India's foreign policy.

During the 10th SAARC Chief Justices Conference, Hemant Batra made a sweeping statement regarding SAARCLAW's landmark achievement in getting a 1 Million US$ grant from Asian Development Bank. Some delegates from Bangladesh were critical of SAARCLAW getting into a subordinate position to ADB because of this grant.

He recently supported the move by Narendra Modi BJP Government in India regarding massive enhancement in fines and penalties related to traffic violations. Whereas generally in India people have been opposed to such arbitrary enhancement on the grounds that India is a developing country and this new measure will lead to more corruption on the Indian streets. Batra on the contrary supports BJP Government on the ground that even the neighbouring country Sri Lanka has enhanced penalties almost ten folds.

Honorary positions 
 Elected Vice President of SAARCLAW (2016–2018)
 Re elected Secretary General of SAARCLAW (2014–2016)
 Elected Secretary-General of SAARCLAW (2011–2013)
 Founder of AKNOI
 Chairperson of IICLAM 
 Expert-Observer for a hearing of the United Nation's Global Commission on HIV and the Law
 Member of the Advisory Board of Organization for International Cooperation (OIC)
 Member of the leadership programme committee of ICAAP11
 Chairman of the panel of Jury of prestigious Asia Corporate Excellence & Sustainability Awards (ACES)
 Active Elected Member of Union of International Associations (UIA)<ref>

References 

1967 births
20th-century Indian lawyers
Living people
Panjab University alumni
Punjabi people
Indian lawyers
Law firm founders
Secretaries General of the South Asian Association for Regional Cooperation